Thierry Valéro is a French rugby league footballer who represented France national rugby league team at the 1995 World Cup.

Playing career
Valéro played for the Rest of the World in 1988 against Great Britain.

He made his debut for France in 1989 and played against the Australia touring team during the 1990 Kangaroo tour of Great Britain and France. He went on to play in twenty four test matches for France, with his last match being at the 1995 World Cup.

Honours

Rugby league
Lord Derby Cup: Runner-up in 1998-99 (FC Lézignan)

References

Living people
French rugby league players
Lézignan Sangliers players
France national rugby league team players
Rugby league hookers
Rugby league locks
1966 births